The Aruwimi River is a tributary of the Congo River, located to the north and east of the Congo.

The Aruwimi begins as the Ituri River, which rises near Lake Albert, in the savannas north of the Kibale River watershed. It then runs generally south southwest until it is joined by the Shari River which flows by Bunia. The Ituri then turns west, through the Ituri Forest, becoming the Aruwimi where the Nepoko (or Nepoki) River joins it, at the town of Bomili. The river continues westward, joining the Congo at Basoko.

The watershed of the Ituri/Aruwimi is almost entirely dense forest, with just a handful of villages along its course, and crossed by roads in about four places. The Kango language (SIL code KZY) is spoken by several thousand villagers just south of Avakubi, and upper reaches of the Ituri are inhabited by the Mbuti (Pygmies).

The Aruwimi was explored by Henry Morton Stanley during his 1887 expedition to "rescue" Emin Pasha. The cataracts above Yambuya made it impossible to use the river for navigation, and the expedition had to go by land, with tremendous difficulty.

Tributaries:
 Nepoko River
 Lenda River

Settlements:
 Bomaneh
 Mongandjo
 Yambuya
 Banalia
 Panga
 Bafwangbe
 Bomili
 Avakubi
 Teturi
 Bunia

References

External links

Rivers of the Democratic Republic of the Congo
Tributaries of the Congo River